Vriesea philippocoburgii is a plant species in the genus Vriesea. This species is endemic to Brazil.

Cultivars
 Vriesea 'Absolutely Fabulous'
 Vriesea 'Aussie Joy'
 Vriesea 'Furcata'
 Vriesea 'Katelyn Woods'
 Vriesea 'Little Phil'
 Vriesea 'Nicci Isley'
 Vriesea 'Phillip'
 Vriesea 'Pink Gusher'
 Vriesea 'Rafael'

References
BSI Cultivar Registry Retrieved 11 October 2009

philippocoburgii
Flora of Brazil